The Joga Pradīpikā (जोगप्रदीपिका, "A Small Light on Yoga") is a hatha yoga text by Ramanandi Jayatarama written in 1737 in a mixture of Hindi, Braj Bhasa, Khari Boli and forms close to Sanskrit. It presents 6 cleansing methods, 84 asanas, 24 mudras and 8 kumbhakas. The text is illustrated in an 1830 manuscript with 84 paintings of asanas, prepared about a hundred years after the text.

Topics

The Joga Pradīpikā covers a broad range of topics on yoga, including the nature of the yogic subtle body, preliminary purifications, yogic seals (mudrās), asanas, prānāyāma (breath-control), mantras, meditation, liberation (moksha), and samādhi.

One of the purifications in the text is the mulashishnasodhana, "the cleansing of the anus and the penis", which  calls for water to be drawn into the anus and squirted out through the penis, which James Mallinson and Mark Singleton gloss as "a feat which is, of course, anatomically impossible."

Prānāyāma is stated to result in liberation, on its own, though some of its breath-control techniques also use mantras. The Joga Pradīpikā however asks the yogi to stay on as a physical body to serve the Lord, rather than choosing liberation. 

The Joga Pradīpikā conflates the mudrās with asanas by describing the mahāmudrā as one of its 84 asanas. Like other late texts, it describes a relatively large number of mudrās, 24 in all.

On meditation, the text reworks the Bhagavata Purana'''s meditation of the goddess Sītā and the god Rāma. On samādhi, the yogi reaches it by the "bee cave" in the sahasrara chakra, the "thousand-petalled lotus", with an unending "unstruck sound".

Asanas

The description of 84 asanas occupies 314 out of 964 verses in the 1737 version. Most of the asanas are said to bring therapeutic benefits; all of them ask the practitioner to direct the gaze (drishti) at the point between the eyebrows or at the end of the nose.

The 84 asanas described and illustrated in the 1830 document include some that are widely practised in modern yoga, but its selection differs markedly from that in other hatha yoga texts such as the Hatha Ratnavali''. Many of the illustrated poses are seated asanas used for meditation, including the ancient Padmasana and Siddhasana, both of which appear twice in the set of illustrations. The number 84 is symbolic rather than literal, indicating that a set is complete and sacred.

References

Sources

 
 
 
 

Hatha yoga texts